Prairie Creek Community School is a K-5, tuition-free, progressive charter school located in Castle Rock Township, Minnesota, United States. Established in 1983, Prairie Creek was founded by a small group of individuals and educators. Prairie Creek Community School became a public charter school in 2002.

Governance 

Current Board
 Ben Miller
 Bonnie Jean Flom
 Kelsey Fitschen-Hemmah
 Ryan Krominga
 Don Findlay
 Molly McGovern
 Lisa Percy
 Jason Buckmeier
 Trish Beckman 

Director

Prairie Creek Community School is directed by Simon Tyler.

Student population 
Prairie Creek Community School has over 100 K-5 students in its student body.

References

External links
Prairie Creek Community School official website

Schools in Dakota County, Minnesota
Public elementary schools in Minnesota
Charter schools in Minnesota